The Labour Exchanges Act 1909 was an Act of Parliament which saw the state-funded creation of labour exchanges, also known as employment exchanges.  The stated purpose was to help the unemployed find employment.

Prior to the creation of these government-funded labour exchanges, workers would have to search for jobs themselves; the first labour exchange was established by social reformer and employment campaigner Alsager Hay Hill in London in 1871.

The act also wanted to improve the mobility of the workforce, which until then had not been achieved.  However, the exchanges were not very effective since only 25% of those listed on the labour exchange workforce found employment through them.

The law was opposed by some trade unions that feared their bargaining power would be reduced by the law and make it easier to recruit cheap labour from distant parts of the country.

See also
 Liberal welfare reforms
 Labour Bureaux (London) Act 1902
 Employment Agencies Act 1973
 United Kingdom agency worker law
 United Kingdom labour law

Notes

United Kingdom labour law
United Kingdom Acts of Parliament 1909
Welfare state in the United Kingdom
1909 in labor relations